En helt vanlig dag på jobben is a 2010 Norwegian comedy-drama directed by Terje Rangnes, starring Jan Gunnar Røise, Jon Øigarden and Ingar Helge Gimle. The film satirises the working method of celebrity gossip magazine Se og Hør.

External links
 
 

2010 films
2010 comedy-drama films
Norwegian comedy-drama films